Tianranxiu néeGao (second half of 13th-century) was a Chinese actress (yueji) of the zaju theater.  She was described as a great beauty and regarded as a national treasure in contemporary China, praised for her roles as heroine and as female members of the Imperial family, and counted Bai Pu and Li Gaizhi among her admirers.

References 
 Lily Xiao Hong Lee, Sue Wiles: Biographical Dictionary of Chinese Women, Volume II: Tang Through Ming 618 - 1644

13th-century Chinese people
13th-century Chinese women
13th-century Chinese actresses
Yuan dynasty actors